The Trowbridge-Badger House is a historic house in Winchester, Massachusetts.  The large 2.5-story house was built c. 1886, and is an excellent local representative of predominantly Queen Anne styling with Colonial Revival features.  The house's irregular roof line, with many gables and projecting sections, is typically Queen Anne, while the shingled porch with Tuscan columns is Colonial Revival.  Little is known of its early owners beyond their names.

The house was listed on the National Register of Historic Places in 1989.

See also
National Register of Historic Places listings in Winchester, Massachusetts

References

Houses on the National Register of Historic Places in Winchester, Massachusetts
Houses in Winchester, Massachusetts